Elegant Resorts is a luxury travel retailer based in Chester, UK. The company was founded in 1988 in Chester by Geoff Moss and Barbara Catchpole. 

The company was sold to Al Tayyar, a global travel group, in 2014 for a reported £14.3 million. Al Tayyar is now known as the Seera Group.

Background 

Elegant Resorts is located in Cheshire and founded in 1988. 

The company was acquired by Thomas Cook Group in April, 2008 for an undisclosed sum. In February 2014, it was sold for £14.3 million to Al Tayyar, a global travel group based in Saudi Arabia. Al Tayyar is now known as the Seera Group. 

In 2018, Lisa Fitzell was named as Managing Director for Elegant Resorts. She joined the business with 30 years’ experience in the travel industry, most recently as group managing director of Diethelm Travel’s Asian businesses based in Bangkok.

Recognition 
In 2010, Elegant Resorts was recognised by The Sunday Times as the Favourite Luxury Tour Operator in their Travel Reader Awards. In 2011, the company won the Best Small Tour Operator in the UK as part of The Ultratravel 100.

Space Travel 

Elegant Resorts was selected by Virgin Galactic in 2007 to sell its space experience, which led to the company becoming the Accredited Space agent for the UK.

References 

Travel and holiday companies of the United Kingdom
Transport companies established in 1988
Companies based in Chester